Tray Walker (August 5, 1992 – March 18, 2016) was an American professional football player who was a cornerback for the Baltimore Ravens of the National Football League (NFL). He played college football for the Texas Southern Tigers, and was drafted by the Ravens in the 4th round of the 2015 NFL draft, ultimately playing only one season with the team before his death.

Walker died on March 18, 2016, from injuries sustained from a dirtbike accident on Florida streets.

High school career 
A native of Miami, Walker attended the city's Northwestern High School, where he played cornerback, punter and goalline receiver for the Bulls, earning honorable mention All-Dade County as a senior. Walker was teammates with Teddy Bridgewater and Amari Cooper. Unrecognized by recruiting analysts and football scouts, Walker's only scholarship offer came from Texas Southern University.

College career 
In his true freshman year at Texas Southern, Walker recorded 22 tackles (17 solo), three interceptions (59 return yards) and a career-best 11 deflected passes.

In his senior year, he earned Second-team All-Southwestern Athletic Conference (2014).

Professional career 
Walker was selected in the 4th round of the 2015 NFL Draft by the Baltimore Ravens making him the highest draft selection from Texas Southern since Joe Burch in 1994. In his only professional season, Walker played in eight games, with his primary contributions going toward special teams for the Ravens, including two tackles.

Death 
On the evening of March 17, 2016, Walker was riding a dirt bike on the street and was fatally injured when he collided with a Ford Escape at an intersection in Liberty City, Florida. He was transported to Jackson Memorial Hospital in Miami, Florida, in critical condition after sustaining serious head injuries and spending much of the night in surgery. He died the following day from his injuries.  According to reports Walker was riding at night without a helmet, had no headlights on, and was wearing dark clothing.

Walker's funeral was held on March 26, 2016, in Miami, Florida.

References

External links
 Baltimore Ravens bio 
 Texas Southern Tigers bio 

1992 births
2016 deaths
American football cornerbacks
Texas Southern Tigers football players
Baltimore Ravens players
Road incident deaths in Florida
Players of American football from Miami
Miami Northwestern Senior High School alumni
Motorcycle road incident deaths